Sourgou is a department or commune of Boulkiemdé Province in central Burkina Faso. As of 2005 it has a population of 13,878. Its capital lies at the town of Sourgou.

Towns and villages
SourgouGuirgoKougsinLâOuoroRogho

References

Departments of Burkina Faso
Boulkiemdé Province